In the 2009 French Open mixed doubles event Victoria Azarenka and Bob Bryan were the defending champions, but Azarenka chose not to participate, and only Bryan competed in the tournament.Bryan partnered with Liezel Huber and won in the final 5–7, 7–6(7–5), 10–7, against Vania King and Marcelo Melo.

Seeds

Draw

Finals

Top half

Bottom half

External links
 Draw
2009 French Open – Doubles draws and results at the International Tennis Federation

Mixed Doubles
French Open by year – Mixed doubles